Heteropsis narova is a butterfly in the family Nymphalidae. It is found on Madagascar. The habitat consists of forests.

References

Elymniini
Butterflies described in 1877
Endemic fauna of Madagascar
Butterflies of Africa
Taxa named by Paul Mabille